A green retrofit is any refurbishment of an existing building that aims to reduce the carbon emissions and environmental impact of the building. This can include improving the energy efficiency of the HVAC and other mechanical systems, increasing the quality of insulation in the building envelope, implementing sustainable energy generation, and aiming to improve occupant comfort and health.

Green retrofits have become increasingly prominent with their inclusion in a number of building rating systems, such as the USGBC's LEED for Existing Buildings: Operations & Maintenance, Passive House EnerPHit, and Green Globes for Existing Buildings. Some governments offer funding towards green retrofits as existing buildings make up a majority of operational buildings and have been identified as a growing area of consideration in the fight against climate change.

Overview 
Most retrofits can be considered somewhat "green" because rather than constructing a new building, an existing one is improved. This saves resources that would otherwise be used to build an entirely new structure. A green retrofit typically aims to incorporate sustainability and save energy costs with each design decision.

Retrofitting a building inherently carries the constraints of the existing building and site. For example, the orientation of a building in regard to the sun has a great impact on its energy performance, but it's generally not within the scope of a retrofit to rotate the building. Budgetary constraints also often impact the energy conservation measures proposed. 

Until recently, green retrofits have generally been considered as one-off projects for specific buildings or clients, but given the increased emphasis on improving the energy efficiency of existing building stock in the face of climate change, they are beginning to be reviewed systematically and at scale. The main challenge this presents for governments and advocacy groups is that the existing building stock is characterized by different uses, located in disparate climatic areas, and uses different construction traditions and system technologies. Because of these disparities, it is difficult to characterize strategies that apply to all buildings.

Green retrofits have recently garnered considerable research attention due to government emphasis on retrofitting old building stock to address climate change. It is estimated that up to half of building stock is always over 40 years old. Older buildings have significantly worse energy performance than their modern counterparts due to shortcomings in their design, deterioration in mechanical system efficiency, and increases in envelope permeability. The energy use intensity of houses in the United States dropped 9% from 1985 to 2004 due to improvements in end-use energy efficiency and code improvements. Unfortunately, this is offset by the overall increase in the total number of houses.

Components of a green retrofit

Integrated design 
Green retrofits utilize an integrated design strategy. This is in opposition to the traditional waterfall design strategy, in which architects, engineers, and contractors operate independently from one another. In an integrated design strategy, these teams work together to leverage their areas of expertise and solve design problems while also considering the building as a whole. This is imperative for a green retrofit, where the design solutions are often constrained by the existing site. This could relate to the orientation and geometry of the existing building form, the size of the site, or the installation requirements of the existing and proposed mechanical systems. Because these constraints affect all aspects of building design, the only way sustainable, effective, and cost-efficient solutions can be synthesized is when project teams consider all these aspects from the project start.

Occupant behavior 
Many sustainable building practices are passive and can be automated, like insulation or light controls. Others depend on the behavior of the building's occupants to realize their full energy efficiency potential. An energy efficient heating system does very little good if the windows are left open in winter. Per Ascione et al., "the first lever of energy efficiency is a proper energy-education of users". Green retrofits can involve training building occupants in sustainable practices and building systems that they'll interact with, which helps ensure that any energy conservation measures used will reach their full design potential. Training can be handled by system manufacturers or the project design team.

Lighting retrofits 
One of the most common forms of a green retrofit is a full or partial lighting retrofit. A lighting retrofit usually consists of replacing all or some of the lightbulbs in a building with newer, more efficient models. This can also include changing light fixtures, ballasts, and drivers. LED bulbs are generally the preferred choice in a lighting retrofit because of their greatly increased efficiency compared to incandescent bulbs, but other types of bulbs like compact fluorescent or metal halides may be used as well.

Lighting retrofits are a popular form of green retrofit because, compared to other methods of improving energy efficiency, they are relatively straightforward to plan and execute, and the energy savings often provide a quick return on investment. Most modern LED and compact fluorescent bulbs are designed to work with existing light fixtures and rarely involve any additional work than removing and screwing in a new lightbulb. The installation is also relatively quick compared to more invasive energy conservation measures.

Lighting retrofits can also include implementing new lighting controls like occupancy sensors, daylight sensors, and timers. When correctly implemented, these controls can reduce the demand for lighting. However, due to the complicated nature of lighting controls, there is debate as to whether or not they are an effective energy conserving measure because of the prevalence of over-optimistic energy usage reduction estimates and the difficulty in predicting the actions of human occupants.

HVAC retrofits 
Heating, ventilation, and air conditioning (HVAC) account for around 50% of a building's operating energy consumption, and HVAC retrofits can account for 40-70% of energy savings. Reducing this consumption can provide both energy and cost savings, so it is the main focus of many green retrofits, especially in colder climates where heating accounts for over 60% of energy use. The heating system, cooling system, air handling systems, humidification systems, and ductwork in the building are often considered.

Heat recovery ventilation is recommended for newly air-sealed homes as it uses the heat from the warm, moist, stale air that is being vented from the home to warm the cool, fresh, and filtered air that is entering the home. This allows for minimal heat loss while mitigating concerns of carbon monoxide poisoning, radon gas, or harmful particulates accumulating in the home.

Other green HVAC retrofits can include implementing a newer, more efficient model of the same type as the existing system, such as replacing an old water boiler with a more efficient one to feed a hydronic heating system. Sometimes a larger system overhaul is merited—for example, exchanging an old boiler for a newer ground or air source heat pump system.

Building envelope retrofits 
Thermal insulation and building envelope performance are key to the overall energy performance of any building. Many older buildings are not insulated up to current standards, let alone up to the standards recommended in many green building rating systems. Many of these buildings spend energy and money heating, cooling, or conditioning the air inside them only to see it seep out through leaks in the building envelope or through poorly insulated windows.

During many green retrofits, the first step towards improving the building's envelope is to evaluate its current shortcomings. Air-sealing is an easily accessible and cost-efficient way to improve the energy efficiency of a home that is mechanically heated or cooled. Caulking can be used to fill gaps in immobile areas like window and door frames and or poorly sealed appliances. Weather stripping can be used where moving parts meet, such as the area between the door and the doorframe or windows that can open. These drafty areas can be found by feeling for temperature differences and drafts on days when the temperature inside the house is dramatically different than the temperature outside the house, burning incense and watching how the smoke moves to detect drafts, or hiring a professional to perform a blower door test. In a blower door test, a door with a fan and a gauge is installed into one of the doorways and the house is depressurized. The gauge can then measure the air changes per hour (ACH), or how many times the volume of air in the house is completely replaced in one hour. The draftier a house is, the higher the air changes per hour will be.

Window retrofits 
Windows are the weakest point of insulation in a building's envelope and contribute greatly to how thermally effective that envelope is. Because of this, windows are another common area of focus for a green retrofit. Similar to a lighting retrofit, windows are a relatively straightforward aspect of a building to retrofit, with easy-to-calculate payback periods. Modern, efficient windows are generally sized for existing window openings and can usually be installed without much additional work on the building envelope.

Most green retrofits will replace older single-pane windows with more efficient triple-paned varieties that are filled with an inert gas such as argon or krypton. These windows have greater R-values, so they insulate a space far better than single-pane windows. Some windows have low-e coatings to control the solar heat gain coefficient.

Green roof retrofits 

Green roofs, also called living roofs, have a number of major benefits, including reducing stormwater runoff and urban heat island effect, increasing roof insulation, improving building acoustics, and providing biodiversity. 

There are many factors to account for when considering a green roof for a green retrofit. Extensive green roofs use a thin substrate layer for the often shorter vegetation that needs less room for roots to grow. Intensive green roofs use a thicker growing substrate to accommodate larger plant species that require more space for their roots. Semi-intensive green roofs fall somewhere in between the two. The strength of the existing structure must be considered; many existing structures were not designed for an intensive green roof, which can carry a considerable structural load. The existing roof also needs to be evaluated for stripping or re-waterproofing. Some roofs can simply be laid over with sedum mats, while others require additional work to prepare. A peaked or sloped roof does not preclude the installation of a green roofing system but can influence the installation costs and product choices available.

In general, older buildings with lower existing insulation values benefit the most from green roof retrofits, and where there are no modifications necessary to install one, green roofs have been shown to have many benefits.

Passive design 
Passive design is a design strategy that uses the shape and placement of the architecture and landscaping to heat, cool, light, ventilate, and sometimes provide power to the building. Often, this impacts the shape of the building envelope, the orientation of the building, and the placement of the building. The shape of the building can also create microclimates in which the building is designed to trap heat or funnel breezes for warming in the winter or cooling in the summer. While these passive design elements are more often applied in newly built green buildings, passive design can still be a consideration in green retrofits. For example, if there are windows that receive very little sunlight in the winter or a large amount of sunlight in the summer, those may be replaced first to reduce an undesirable amount of heat lost in the winter or gained in the summer. Using landscaping, such as planting a deciduous tree in front of south-facing windows to maximize solar heat gain in the winter while shading the windows in the summer, is also an example of passive design.

Costs, barriers, and benefits 
Possible benefits of green retrofits include:

 Improved energy security
 Reduced air pollution
 Reduced greenhouse gas emissions and impact on climate change
 Increased thermal comfort
 Enhanced indoor air quality and occupant health
 Generation of local jobs
 Reduction of peak electrical demand

Possible barriers to green retrofits include:

 Initial cost and financing
 Lack of knowledge and experience of the designers, architects, construction workers, inspectors, and financial institutions involved in the project
 Building code regulations
 Lack of consumer interest

The scope of a green retrofit can vary widely. It can involve specific building systems, like the lighting, or can be a full renovation of all non-structural components. While a lighting retrofit is straightforward to execute and relatively unobtrusive to building occupants, it won't generally carry as much of a benefit or cost as an insulation retrofit. When weighing the benefits and costs of a green retrofit, each of these components must be considered towards the project as a whole.

While green retrofits do have an up-front cost, the amount depends on how extensive the retrofits are. Likewise, the kind of retrofit that is implemented will also impact how fast the investment is returned in savings. The economic feasibility of a green retrofit depends on the state of installed systems of the existing building, the proposed design, the energy costs of the local utility grid, and the climatic conditions of the site. Any economic incentives granted will depend on what country or state the project is in. These incentives differ regionally and can affect the total project feasibility. In Ireland, for example, "shallow" green retrofits have been found to be economically feasible, but "deep" retrofits are often not feasible without government grant aid to offset the initial capital costs.

The EU has found that implementing green retrofit programs comes with the benefit of "energy security, job creation, fuel poverty alleviation, health and indoor comfort".

Green retrofits can carry benefits such as the re-use of existing building material. Concrete and steel have some of the highest embodied energy impacts of any building material and can account for up to 60% of the carbon used in the construction of a building. They are primarily used in the structure of a building, which usually remains untouched in retrofits.  

Most types of green retrofit introduce new building materials into the space which can themselves emit harmful indoor air pollutants. The amount, type, and exposure to these pollutants will depend on the material itself, what it is used for, and how it is installed. Often, green retrofits call for sealing leaks in the building envelope to prevent the escape of conditioned air, but if this is not offset by an increase in ventilation, it can contribute to higher concentrations of indoor air pollutants in the building.

See also 
 Carbon neutrality
 Greening
 HOME STAR
 PACE financing
 Sustainable refurbishment
 Deep energy retrofit
 Efficient energy use
 Sustainable design
 Environmental design

References

External links 
 Residential Sector: Designing a prescriptive whole house retrofit program, Michael Wheeler, California Public Utilities Commission.
Buildings, Project Regeneration. 2021.

Building engineering
Energy conservation
Sustainable building